The  was a grouping of naval aviation and surface units.

Assignments and Components

Commanders

Chiefs of Staff

Notes

References
 

Fleets of the Imperial Japanese Navy
Units of the Imperial Japanese Navy Air Service
Military units and formations established in 1941
Military units and formations disestablished in 1945